Zinc finger protein 33A is a protein that in humans is encoded by the ZNF33A gene.

Interactions
ZNF33A has been shown to interact with ZAK.

References

Further reading